Uralsk is a rural locality (a selo) and the administrative centre of Uralsky Selsoviet, Uchalinsky District, Bashkortostan, Russia. The population was 1,717 as of 2010. There are 41 streets.

Geography 
Uralsk is located 40 km southwest of Uchaly (the district's administrative centre) by road. Istamgulovo is the nearest rural locality.

References 

Rural localities in Uchalinsky District